Wangkhem Linthoingambi Devi (born 1 March 1995) is an Indian international footballer who plays as a left back for KRYPHSA and the India women's national team.

Club career
Wangkhem has played for KRYPHSA in India.

International career
Wangkhem capped for India at senior level during the 2019 South Asian Games.

Honours

India
 South Asian Games Gold medal: 2019

KRYPHSA
Indian Women's League runner-up: 2019–20

Manipur
 Senior Women's National Football Championship: 2019–20
 National Games Gold medal: 2022

References

1995 births
Living people
People from Imphal
Sportswomen from Manipur
Footballers from Manipur
Indian women's footballers
India women's international footballers
Women's association football fullbacks
Kryphsa F.C. Players
Indian Women's League players
South Asian Games gold medalists for India
South Asian Games medalists in football